Lomatia myricoides , commonly known as the river lomatia, is a shrub native to New South Wales and Victoria in southeastern Australia.

Description
They are glabrous and the leaf edges may be straight or adorned with several serrations. The flowers are white or cream in colour, though pink-tinged flowers have been recorded.

Taxonomy
German botanist Karl Friedrich von Gaertner first described this species as Embothrium myricoides in 1807. At the time, Embothrium was a wastebasket taxon to which many proteaceae were assigned.  It was given its current binomial name by Karel Domin in 1921. The species name comes from the resemblance of the leaves to those of the genus Myrica. (The suffix -oides means "likeness" in Latin.) Common names include river lomatia, mountain beech and long-leaf lomatia.

Hybrids have been recorded with tree lomatia (Lomatia fraseri) on the Southern Tablelands, with native holly (L. ilicifolia) on the New South Wales south coast, and with crinkle bush (L. silaifolia) on the New South Wales Central Coast and Central Tablelands. Analysis of chloroplast DNA showed that there is extensive hybridization between the five species (L. arborescens, L. fraseri, L. ilicifolia, L. myricoides and L. silaifolia) of mainland southeastern Australia, though each is distinct enough to warrant species status.

Distribution and habitat

The range is from the New South Wales Central Coast south into eastern Victoria to the Dandenong Ranges. Lomatia myricoides is found in moist sheltered areas such as riverbank forests and montane forest, on loamy or sandy alluvial, or on basalt-derived soils. Associated species along watercourses include watergum (Tristaniopsis laurina), grey myrtle (Backhousia myrtifolia), cedar wattle (Acacia elata), coachwood (Ceratopetalum apetalum), tantoon (Leptospermum polygalifolium) and coral fern (Gleichenia dicarpa). Montane trees that L. myricoides grows as an understory with include broad-leaved manna gum (Eucalyptus mannifera), broad-leaved peppermint (E. dives), as well as the shrubs daphne heath (Brachyloma daphnoides) and prickly broom heath (Monotoca scoparia).

Ecology
It has a woody lignotuber, from which it regenerates after bushfire. Small ants and flies forage for nectar in the flowers.

Cultivation
Not commonly seen in cultivation, Lomatia myricoides grows in semi-shade in situations with some moisture. It appears to tolerate Phytophthora cinnamomi.

Joseph Maiden reported that its wood was light and hard, and easily worked.

References

Flora of New South Wales
Flora of Victoria (Australia)
myricoides
Proteales of Australia